Enrico Mauthe Von Degerfeld (born 27 April 2004) is an Italian professional footballer who plays as a defender for Sambenedettese, on loan from Palermo.

Club career

Palermo 
Born in Palermo, he starts playing football in CEI and Calcio Sicilia.
In 2015 he moved to Terzo Tempo, a well-known football school in the Sicilian capital, and then moved to Palermo on 21 September 2017. The following year he moved to Empoli, where he played for a year, and later returned to Palermo.

In the summer of 2021, he was called up by Giacomo Filippi to be part of the first team squad, later making his senior debut on 20 November 2021 during a home Serie C league game against Paganese.

Sambenedettese 
On 2 September 2022, Mauthe was loaned out to Serie D fallen giants Sambenedettese until the end of the season. Seven days after his arrive, Mauthe made his debut for the Samb in 0–2 loss against Cynthialbalonga.

He became immediately a key player in Sambenedettese's defence, playing fourtheen game straight until the Serie D 0–0 draw against Vastogirardi in wich he suffered muscle aches.

Career statistics

Club

References

External links 
 

2004 births
Living people
Footballers from Palermo
Italian footballers
Serie C players
Palermo F.C. players
A.S. Sambenedettese players
Association football defenders